Toftwood is a locality within the town of Dereham (where the population is included.), in the county of Norfolk in the United Kingdom.

Dereham